"Mon Pays" is a 1964 song by Gilles Vigneault.

Mon Pays may also refer to:

 "Mon Pays" (Faudel song), 2006
 Mon Pays, a boat of French-Canadian solo sailor Hubert Marcoux
"Mon pays", track on 2000 album Motel Capri by Les Cowboys Fringants

See also
Mon pays le Québec, a Canadian political party